In India, the police forces of the states and union territories are responsible for law enforcement in the states and union territories.

History
The Police Act of 1861 established the principles of organization for police forces in India and, with minor modifications, continues in effect. Although state police forces are separate and may differ in quality of equipment and resources, their patterns of organization and operation are similar.

Organisation

State Police Force

Authority over a State Police Force is held by the State's Home Department, led by a chief or principal secretary (generally an Indian Administrative Service officer). Each state has a state police force (headed by a director general of police, an Indian Police Service officer), which is responsible for maintaining law and order in the state's townships and rural areas.

The state police is headed by an Indian Police Service officer with the rank of Director General of Police (DGP), assisted by one or more Additional Directors General of Police (ADGs). Other DG rank officers head autonomous bodies not controlled by the DGP, such as the police recruitment board, fire service and police training. State forces are organised into zones, which consist of two (or more) ranges. Important zones are headed by an additional director general of police, and other zones are headed by an Inspector General of Police (IG). Ranges consist of several districts. Important ranges are headed by an IG, and other ranges are headed by a Deputy Inspector General of Police (DIG)

Important districts are headed by a senior Superintendent of Police (SSP), and other districts are headed by a superintendent of police (SP). If an SSP is heading the district, they are assisted by two (or more) SPs. If an SP is heading the district, they are generally assisted by one or two SPs. Each district is divided into sub-divisions or circles, under a Deputy Superintendent of Police (DSP). Each sub-division consists of several police stations commanded by an Inspector of Police, who is assisted by sub-inspectors (SIs) and Assistant Sub-Inspectors (ASIs). In rural areas, a sub-inspector is in charge of a police station; sub-inspectors (and higher) can file a charge sheet in court.

District SPs have discretionary powers and oversee subordinate police stations, criminal-investigation detachments, equipment storehouses and armories, and traffic police. But 
District SPs are not empowered as executive magistrates. The district magistrate (DM, an IAS officer) exercises these powers, which include promulgating Section 144 of the Code of Criminal Procedure (CrPC) and issuing arms licenses.

Union Territory Police Force

Authority over a Union Territory Police Force is held by the Ministry of Home Affairs (India), led by the Home Minister (India) and secondarily by the Administrator/Lieutenant Governor (generally an Indian Administrative Service/Indian Police Service officer) of their respective Union Territory. Each UT has a UT Police Force (headed by a Director General of Police/Inspector General of Police, an Indian Police Service officer), which is responsible for maintaining law and order in the state's townships and rural areas.
Big UTs are divided into Zones, each zone is headed by IGP and whole UT is headed by DGP, but Small UTs are only divided into districts, each district is headed by SP and whole UT is headed by IGP. But the Case is different in the Commissionerate System.

Working Conditions
Working conditions and pay are poor, especially in the lower echelons. Recruits receive about 27,000 per month. Opportunities for promotion are limited because of the system of horizontal entry into higher grades. Allegations of bribery, attributable to low pay and poor working conditions, have been widespread. A 2016 article on the Maharashtra state police describes why reform is needed.

Women in Indian Police Forces

Women have entered into the higher echelons of Indian police in greater numbers since the late 1980s, primarily through the Indian Police Service system. Female officers were first used in 1972, and a number of women hold key positions in state police organizations. Their absolute numbers, however, are small. Uniformed and undercover women police officers have been deployed in New Delhi as the Anti-Eve Teasing Squad, which combats the sexual harassment of women ("Eves"). Several women-only police stations have been established in Tamil Nadu to handle sex crimes against women.

Recruitment
The central government civil servants of Group 'A' under Indian Police Service cadre are recruited through civil services examination conducted by Union Public Service Commission. They command and provide leadership to the State and UT Police Forces.

The state government civil servants of Group 'B' under State Police Services cadre are recruited by combined competitive examination conducted by State Public Service Commission.

The state government civil servants of Group 'C' and Group 'D' of State Police cadre are recruited by subordinate services examination conducted by State Public Service Commission.

The central government civil servants of Group 'B' under Union Territory Police Service cadre  are recruited by civil services examination conducted by Union Public Service Commission.

The central government civil servants of Group 'C' and Group 'D' of Union Territory Police cadre are recruited by combined graduate level examination and common entrance test conducted by Staff Selection Commission and National Recruitment Agency.

Uniforms

Uniforms of state and local police vary by grade, region, and type of duty. The main service uniform for state police is khaki. Some city forces, such as the Kolkata Police, wear white uniforms. Headgear differs by rank and state; officers usually wear a peaked cap, and constables wear berets or sidecaps.

Services such as the Central Bureau of Investigation do not wear a uniform instead business dress (shirt, tie, blazer, etc.) is worn with a badge. 

Special-service armed police have tactical uniforms in accordance with their function, and traffic police generally wear a white uniform.

Training

West Bengal, Kerala, Tamil Nadu and Maharashtra have taken steps to train their police forces by advanced police-training schools such as Scotland Yard, the Atlanta Police Department and the World Police Academy in Canada. The Tamil Nadu Police Academy is seeking university status, and the Kerala Police is South Asia's first police force to adopt community policing.

List of Police Training Institutions of States and UTs

Police Infrastructure

List of State Police Housing Corporations

Police Communication Facilities

List of State Police Forces of India

List of Union Territory Police Forces of India

Police Commissionerates

Some major metropolitan cities use the police commissionerate system (like Delhi, Mumbai, Chennai, Kolkata, Bangalore, Hyderabad, Ahmedabad, Lucknow etc.), headed by a Police Commissioner. Demand for this system is increasing as it gives police a free hand to act freely and take control of any situation. According to BPRD India, 65 large cities and suburban areas currently have this system. Even in British Raj, the presidency towns of Calcutta, Bombay and Madras had commissionerate system. Reporting to the Police Commissioner(CP) are the Joint Police Commissioner(Joint CPs), Deputy Commissioner of Police(DCPs) and Assistant Commissioner of Police(ACPs). Commissioners of police and their deputies are empowered as executive magistrates to enforce Section 144 of the CrPC and issue arms licenses.

List of Police Commissionerates in India

State and UT Armed Police Forces

In most states and territories, police forces are divided into civil (unarmed) police and armed contingents. Civil police staff police stations, conduct investigations, answer routine complaints, perform traffic duties, and patrol the streets. They usually carry lathis: bamboo staffs, weighted (or tipped) with iron.

Armed police are divided into two groups: district armed police and the Provincial Armed Constabulary (Pradeshik). District armed police are organized like an army infantry battalion. Assigned to police stations, they perform guard and escort duties. Each state police force maintains an armed force, with names such as Provincial Armed Constabulary (PAC) and Special Armed Police, which is responsible for emergencies and crowd control. They are generally activated on orders from a Deputy Inspector General or higher-level authorities. States which maintain armed contingents use them as an emergency reserve strike force. The units are organized as a mobile armed force under state control or, in the case of district armed police (who are not as well equipped), as a force directed by district superintendents and generally used for riot control.

The Provincial Armed Constabulary is an armed reserve maintained at key locations in some states and activated on orders from the deputy inspector general and higher-level authorities. Armed constabulary are not usually in contact with the public unless they are assigned to VIP duty or maintaining order during fairs, festivals, athletic events, elections, and natural disasters. They may be sent to quell outbreaks of student or labour unrest, organized crime, and communal riots; to maintain key guard posts, and to participate in anti-terrorism operations. Depending on the assignment, the Provincial Armed Constabulary may only carry lathis.

List of State Armed Police Forces

Indian Reserve Battalion

The Indian Reserve Battalion is an elite unit trained to deal with a specific situation. It is a type of Armed Police Force that has been sanctioned to States and Union Territories.

List of UT Armed Police Forces

State and UT VIP Security Forces
State and UT Armed Police Forces are also assigned with the VIP Security along with CAPFs. They are also assigned the security of important places such as State Legislative Buildings, High Courts, Raj Bhavans, Raj Niwas, Administrator Office, Secretariats,etc.

Special Forces

Special Forces are the special armed police forces created for some special purposes such as Counter Insurgency Operations, Counter Naxalites Operations, etc. Special Commandos are trained for different purposes such as Jungle Warfare, Mountain Warfare, etc.

List of State/UT Special Police Forces

State Industrial Security Forces
State Industrial Security Force is a type of State Armed Police Force, created on the lines of Central Industrial Security Force to protect the airports, factories, etc. of state importance.

List of State Industrial Security Forces

Fire Service, Home Guard, Civil Defence and Disaster Management

Home Guards
Police in the States and UTs are assisted by units of volunteer Home Guards under guidelines formulated by the Ministry of Home Affairs.

List of FS, CD, HG and State Disaster Response Forces

State and UT Coastal Police (Marine Police) & River Police
State/UT Coastal Police is type of State/UT Armed Police which was created to make an extra security layer on the coastal region. Coastal Police have the responsibility to secure the coasts of the respective States and UTs, along the Indian Coast Guard.

List of State and UT Coastal Police

List of River Police Forces

Traffic Police

Highway and traffic police in small towns are under the state police; traffic police in cities are under the metropolitan and state police. Traffic police maintain a smooth traffic flow and stop offenders. Highway police secure the highways and catch speeders. Accidents, registrations, and vehicle data are checked by traffic police.

Traffic Police

Highway Police
Highway Police or Highway Patrol is a specialized unit of state police forces. The main objectives of Highway Police are controlling Traffic, enforcement of Traffic Laws, prevention of Road Accidents, providing immediate attention and assistance to victims of accidents, handling of Law & Order issues, and enforcement of Laws on National Highways and State Highways, etc. Each Highway Patrol Vehicle is assigned an 'Operational area' and a Base Station.

Railway Police

GRP units are a state maintained forces with its own command structure on Railways with the maintenance cost borne on 50% basis each by particular State and Railways. RPF maintains liaison with GRP for the Law & Order and Crime related matters.

List of State and UT Government Railway Police

Tourist Police
As the security of tourists is a state subject, the Ministry of Tourism (India), in consultation with the State Governments and Union Territory Administrations, had proposed to set up tourist police units at prominent tourist spots in the country. As of 2018, 14 States/UTs have deployed the Tourist Police in their States/UTs.

List of Tourist Police

Criminal Investigation Department (CID) / Crime Branch

A Criminal Investigation Department (CID) or Crime Branch is a specialized investigation Wing of the State Police forces of India responsible for the investigation of crime, based on the Criminal Investigation Departments of British police forces. CID is further split into Crime Branch (CB-CID), Anti Narcotics and many further divisions concerned with matters pertaining to crime, investigation, prosecution and collection of criminal intelligence,depending upon the state's Police administration . The nomenclature of CID is different in various states. Some states it is known as Crime Branch and others Criminal Investigation Department (CID) or Criminal Investigation Agency.The functioning of this wing is almost same in all the states.

List of Crime Investigation Departments and Branches

List of CID in Police Commissionerates

State Enforcement Branches (Economic Offences Wing)
To detect and prevent the commercial crimes, tax evasions, etc. in the State, some States have their own separate Enforcement Branches with their Police Departments.

State Bureau of Investigation
1. Punjab Bureau of Investigation

Special Investigation Team (SIT)
To investigate the heinous crimes, State Governments/UT Administrations can deploy the Special Investigation Teams.

Technical Services

State/UT Crime Records Bureau
At the National Level, National Crime Records Bureau was set up. At the State Level, State Crime Records Bureau was set up under the CID of the State Police. At the District Level, District Crime Records Bureau(s) were also set up in States under the SCRBs.

At the UT Level, UT Crime Records Bureau was set up under the CID of the UT Police. At the District Level, District Crime Records Bureau(s) were also set up in UTs under the UTCRBs.

List of Technical Services

Anti-Corruption Agencies (Vigilance)

See also
Commissioner of Police (India)
Crime in India
Law enforcement in India
Police ranks and insignia of India

References

External links 

 
India